Texas's 35th congressional district is a district that was created as a result of the 2010 United States census. The first candidates ran in the 2012 House elections and were seated for the 113th United States Congress. This election was won by Lloyd Doggett, who previously represented Texas's 25th congressional district before redistricting. The shape of the district has been described as one of the ten most gerrymandered in the United States.

The district includes parts of the San Antonio metropolitan area (primarily black- and Hispanic-majority areas), including portions of Bexar County, thin strips of Comal and Hays Counties, a portion of Caldwell County, and portions of southern and eastern Austin in Travis County.

In March 2017, a panel of federal judges ruled that the 35th district was illegally drawn with discriminatory intent. In August 2017, another panel of federal judges in San Antonio ruled that the district was unconstitutional. However, the district was allowed to stand in the U.S. Supreme Court's 2018 Abbott v. Perez ruling.

Greg Casar, from Austin, won the 2022 election for this seat; Doggett moved to the newly created 37th district, centered almost entirely on Austin and containing small amounts of its suburbs, and won the election there. As a result, Austin will be represented by two Democrats in the House.

With a Cook PVI of D+21 (as of 2023), it is now the second-most Democratic district that includes Austin. Only the 37th is more Democratic with a D+24 rating.

Election results from presidential races

List of representatives

Election results

2012

2014

2016

2018

2020

References

35
Constituencies established in 2013
2013 establishments in Texas